Payola, 2002 - 2012 is a 2013 compilation album by The Cribs, released on 12 March 2013. It features the previously unreleased "Leather Jacket Love Song" - the last song recorded with erstwhile guitarist Johnny Marr.

Formats

The album was released as a standard edition 22-track CD and download, plus a 22 track double LP. A special 40 track 'Anthology Edition' CD was also released, with a bonus 18-track disc of b-sides.

Track listing
Another Number
 Come on, be a No-One
 I'm a Realist
 Hey Scenesters!
 We Share the Same Skies
 You Were Always the One
 Anna
Cheat on Me
 Back to the Bolthole
 We Were Aborted
 Our Bovine Public
 I've Tried Everything
 Direction
 Glitters Like Gold
 Be Safe
 Mirror Kissers
 Men's Needs
 We Can No Longer Cheat
 Chi-Town
 The Wrong Way to Be
 City of Bugs
 Leather Jacket Love Song

Bonus Disc

 Glandular Fever Go the Best of Me
 On a Hotel Wall
 Saturday Night Facts of Life
 Kind Words from The Broken Hearted
 It Happened So Fast
 Eat Me
 Fairer Sex
 Advice from a Roving Artist
 You're Gonna Lose Us
 Get Yr Hands Out of My Grave
 My Adolescent Dreams
 Bastards of Young
 To Jackson
 Better Than Me
 So Hot Now
 Is Anybody There?
Don't You Wanna Be Relevant?
Don't Believe in Me

Critical reception

Payola was well received by critics. DIY magazine called it a "staggeringly good collection of songs" and ruminated that the album "offers a compelling argument of the threesome as the most important and greatest UK band of the past 10 years" in a 9/10 review. In their 8/10 review, Virgin notes that "This release shows what a huge footprint The Cribs have made on the modern music scene." Q magazine referred to the album as "A reminder of their heartfelt commitment to a struggling underground ideal" in a 4 star review, whilst The Quietus called The Cribs "A national treasure". In a more mixed 6/10 review, Uncut magazine praised the band's ability to write a single, but refers to the b-side disc as "best left to the completists".

References

The Cribs albums
2013 compilation albums